John Spenser (alias Hatcliffe and Tyrrwhit) (1601–1671) was an English Jesuit theologian. He was born in Lincolnshire. He died at Grafton; at the time of his death he was chaplain to the Earl of Shrewsbury.

Life
Spenser converted to Catholicism while a student at Christ's College, Cambridge, and entered the Society of Jesus in 1627. After having professed moral theology at Liège, 1642, and also having served the "Camp Mission", he returned to England. He took part, at Whitsuntide, 1657, in a conference, much spoken of at the time, with two Anglican divines, Dr. Peter Gunning and Dr. John Pearson, afterward bishops. All the disputants, including Spenser's Catholic colleague, Dr. John Lenthall, M.D., were Cambridge men, and may have known one another.

Works
An account of the conference was published in Paris, 1658, under the title, Schism Unmasked, probably by Spenser. He also wrote: [Thirty-Six] Questions propounded to the Doctors of the Reformed Religion (Paris, 1657); Scripture Mistaken (London, 1660); and other books which won him a high name as a controversialist.

See also

References

External links 

Attribution
 The entry cites:
Henry Foley, Records of the English Province, S. J. (1884), II, 194; 
Joseph Gillow, Bibl. Dict. Eng. Cath., s. v.

1610 births
1671 deaths
17th-century English Jesuits
Alumni of Christ's College, Cambridge